Cannock is a town in the Cannock Chase district in the county of Staffordshire, England. It had a population of 29,018. Cannock is not far from the nearby towns of Walsall, Burntwood, Stafford and Telford. The cities of Lichfield and Wolverhampton are also nearby.

Cannock lies to the north of the West Midlands conurbation on the M6, A34 and A5 roads, and to the south of The Chase, an Area of Outstanding Natural Beauty (AONB). Part of The Cannock Chase is the Gruffalo trail. Cannock is served by a railway station on the Chase Line. The town comprises four district council electoral wards and the Cannock South ward includes the civil parish of Bridgtown, but the rest of Cannock is unparished.

History
Cannock was in the Domesday Book of 1086. It was called Chnoc c.1130, Cnot in 1156, Canot in 1157, and Canoc in 1198. Cannock is probably Old English cnocc meaning 'hillock', modified by Norman pronunciation by the insertion of a vowel to Canoc. The name may refer to Shoal Hill, north-west of the town.

Cannock was a small rural community until mining increased heavily during the mid-to-late 19th century. The area then continued to grow rapidly with many industries coming to the area because of its proximity to the Black Country and its coal reserves. Cannock's population continued to increase steadily in the 20th century and its slight fall since the 1981 census has been more than compensated for by house-building in the adjoining village of Heath Hayes. The last colliery to close in the town was Mid Cannock in 1967, and the last remaining colliery to close in the Cannock Chase area was Littleton (in Huntington) in 1993.

The total population of the built-up area defined in 2011 was 86,121, making it the second largest in Staffordshire if Swadlincote in Derbyshire is excluded from the Burton upon Trent Built-up Area (BUA). There is some green belt, particularly between the Cannock BUA and the much larger West Midlands BUA to the south.  As well as the Lichfield, Stafford, East Staffordshire, and South Staffordshire Districts.

A house known as The Green, which dated from the 1730s and which was the home of Sir Robert Fisher, 4th Baronet, became the headquarters of Cannock Urban District Council in 1927. It was converted into offices in the 1980s, initially for Cannock Chase Technical College but, in 2016, it was refurbished for private use.

Cannock Chase German war cemetery is located nearby containing 4,885 German military dead from the First and Second World Wars. It is managed by the Commonwealth War Graves Commission.

In April 2021, the McArthur Glen Designer Outlet West Midlands opened on the outskirts of the town at Mill Green.

Geography
Cannock is on a south-west facing slope, falling from the highest point on Cannock Chase (244 m) at Castle Ring, to about 148 m in the town centre and 111 m near Wedges Mills. The soil is light with a gravel and clay subsoil, and there are extensive coal measures.

Climate
Cannock has a moderate, temperate climate. See Penkridge weather station for details of average temperature and rainfall figures taken between 1981 and 2010 at the Met Office weather station in Penkridge (around 5 miles (8 km) north-west of Cannock).

Location

Demography
In the decade to 2011 the number of dwellings rose by 7.8% to 13,152. The ward with the biggest increase (16.1%) was Cannock South.
Of the town's 12,690 households in the 2011 census, 31.5% were one-person households including 13.9% where that person was 65 or over. 63.6% were one family with no others (9.0% all pensioners, 30.9% married or same-sex civil partnership couples, 12.3% cohabiting couples and 11.3% lone parents). 27.7% of households had dependent children including 5.5% with no adults in employment. 59.3% of households owned their homes outright or with a mortgage or loan.

Of the town's 23,717 residents in the 2011 census aged 16 and over, 33.5% were single (never married), 45.2% married, 0.15% in a registered same-sex civil partnership, 2.6% separated, 10.4% divorced and 8.2% widowed. 33.4% had no formal qualifications and 42.9% had level 2+ qualifications, meaning 5+ GCSEs (grades A*-C) or 1+ 'A' levels/ AS levels (A-E) or equivalent minimum.

72.7% of the 10,509 men aged 16 to 74 were economically active, including 45.1% working full-time, 5.6% working part-time and 12.6% self-employed. The male unemployment rate (Male unemployment)(of those economically active) was 9.9%. 60.7% of the 10,724 women aged 16 to 74 were economically active, including 26.8% working full-time, 23.5% working part-time and 3.1% self-employed. The female unemployment rate (of those economically active) was 7.5%.

Of people in employment aged 16 to 74, 13.5% worked in basic industries (ONS categories A, B, and D-F including 11.1% in construction), 14.2% in manufacturing, and 72.2% in service industries (ONS categories G-U including 19.5% in wholesale and retail trade and vehicle repair, 11.6% in health and social work, 7.4% in education, 6.2% in transport and storage, 5.8% in public administration, 5.6% in accommodation and catering, and 4.7% in administrative and support service activities). While 27.7% of households did not have access to a car or van, 76.1% of people in employment travelled to work by car or van.

75.5% of residents described their health as good or very good. The proportion who described themselves as White British was 95.6%, with all white ethnic groups making up 97.4% of the population. The ethnic make-up of the rest of the population was 1.0% mixed/multiple ethnic groups, 0.69% Indian/Pakistani/Bangladeshi, 0.34% Chinese, 0.17% other Asian, 0.35% Black and 0.065% other. 3.1% of Cannock's residents were born outside the United Kingdom.

Built-up area subdivisions

Media

Newspapers
Cannock had a free weekly local newspaper, the Cannock & Rugeley Chronicle (an edition of the Cannock & Lichfield Chronicle).
It ceased as a physical publication in October 2018 although it is still available as a paid-for subscription via the Express & Star website (see below)

Another free weekly, the Chase Post (an edition of the Cannock Chase & Burntwood Post), ceased publication in November 2011.

The Express & Star is a paid-for local newspaper, published in Wolverhampton on weekdays.

TV
Regional local news is provided through BBC Midlands Today and ITV News Central, which also serve the wider area of the West Midlands.

Radio
Cannock is served by the national radio stations, and West Midlands "regional" licences Greatest Hits Radio Birmingham & The West Midlands, Smooth Radio West Midlands and Heart West Midlands. The town is also covered by Free Radio Black Country and Shropshire on 97.2 and BBC WM on 95.6 FM.

Cannock is served by its own community radio station, called Cannock Chase Radio FM, based in Wynns Venture Centre.The FM frequencies are 94fm for the Cannock and Hednesford area.  89.6 for Rugeley and Trent Valley and 89.8 For Lichfield and beyond. People can also listen back on their digital streaming devices.

Transport

Cannock is located close to the M6, M6 Toll and M54 motorways.  The main A roads are the A5 (east-west) and A34 (north-south).

Rail
Cannock railway station closed in 1965 as part of the Beeching cuts but reopened in 1989. It is part of the Rugeley – Cannock – Walsall – Birmingham line operated by West Midlands Trains. Over the years, usage of this station, and the line overall, have increased to unprecedented levels. Services initially were hourly services between Birmingham New Street and Stafford (cut back to Rugeley Trent Valley in 2008). By 2013, usage had become significant enough to warrant electrification of the railway line, which was completed in 2019.

The Rugeley - Hednesford - Cannock - Walsall - Birmingham line operated by West Midlands Trains serves the three railway stations in the conurbation. These are at Hednesford, Cannock, and Landywood. There was also a service to Stafford on the Chase Line but this was cut back to Rugeley due to congestion on the West Coast Main Line.

In May 2019, West Midlands Trains began operating electric trains from this station. The vast majority of services are to Rugeley Trent Valley in the north, southbound trains operate to Birmingham International and London Euston. The journey time to Birmingham is around 36 minutes. On Sundays, trains operate as far south as Coventry.

Bus
D&G Bus operate the majority of bus services around Cannock from a depot at Delta Way under the Chaserider brand.

Arriva Midlands were previously the main operator around Cannock but their operations based at their Cannock depot were sold to D&G Bus during 2020.

Select Bus Services  also operate a small number of services while National Express West Midlands service X51 links Cannock with Birmingham via Walsall and Great Wyrley.

No Chaserider buses operate on Sunday or bank holiday, however National Express service X51 does with funding from the McArthurGlen Designer outlet which the bus serves.

Cannock Bus Station also links to Hednesford, Rugeley, Stafford, Lichfield (62 Lichfield–Cannock), Wolverhampton, Walsall, Brownhills in addition to smaller towns and villages like Great Wyrley and Norton Canes.

Education
Cannock Chase High School is a non-denominational mixed comprehensive with just over 1000 pupils aged 11–18.

Cardinal Griffin Catholic College is a voluntary aided Roman Catholic secondary school with around 950 pupils aged 11–18.

Chase Grammar School (called Lyncroft House School 1980–1996 then Chase Academy until January 2013) is an independent co-educational boarding school with a day nursery and over 200 pupils up to age 19 including many international students.

South Staffordshire College closed its Cannock Campus in July 2017, but reopened it the following summer as the new Cannock Chase Skills and Innovation Hub with courses starting there from September 2018.

Notable people 

 Walter Colman (1600 in Cannock – 1645) a Franciscan friar
 Henry Sacheverell (1674–1724) a High Church Anglican clergyman, onetime Rector of Cannock and polemical preacher
 Frank Edward Tylecote CBE (1879 in Cannock – 1965), physician, Professor of Medicine at Manchester University, and early researcher into link between smoking and lung cancer
 Vernon Rylands Parton (1897 in Cannock – 1974), prolific inventor of chess variants, including Alice Chess
 Jennie Lee (1904–1988), MP for Cannock 1945–1970, Minister in the Department of Education and Science and the driving force for the creation of the Open University
 Raymond Furnell (1936–2006), curate of Cannock 1965–69 and the Dean of York 1994-2003
 Carole Ashby (born 1955 in Cannock) an English actress and former pin-up girl
 Sir Patrick McLoughlin (born 1957) a Conservative politician, MP for the Derbyshire Dales, went to school in Cannock
 Steve Edge (born 1972 in Cannock) an English actor, writer and former comedian
 Chris Overton (born 1988 in Cannock) an English actor and filmmaker

Writing 
 Arthur Hopcraft (1932–2004) author, reporter & TV scriptwriter, wrote perceptively of his upbringing in Cannock
 Jed Mercurio (born 1966) a British television writer, producer, director and novelist; brought up in Cannock

Music 

 Elgar Howarth (born 1935 in Cannock) an English conductor, composer and trumpeter
 Mel Galley (1948 in Cannock – 2008) former Whitesnake guitarist and songwriter
 Glenn Hughes (born 1952 in Cannock) former bassist/vocalist with Deep Purple
 Robert Lloyd (born 1959 in Cannock) the lead singer with The Nightingales and formerly with The Prefects
 Balaam and the Angel a Scottish rock band founded in Cannock in 1984

Sport 

 Alec Talbot (1902 in Cannock – 1975) professional footballer, 260 caps mainly for Aston Villa F.C.
 Tom Galley (1915 in Cannock - 2000) professional footballer, over 200 caps mainly for Wolverhampton Wanderers F.C.
 Harry Kinsell (1921 in Cannock – 2000) professional footballer, over 200 caps mostly for West Brom and West Ham
 Gordon Lee (born 1934 in Cannock), former professional footballer and football manager
 Malcolm Beard (born 1942 in Cannock), former professional footballer 350 caps, mostly for Birmingham City F.C.
 Jim Rhodes (1946 in Cannock – 2015) professional golfer
 Paul Cooper (born 1953 in Cannock) former professional football goalkeeper, over 500 caps mostly for Ipswich Town, 
 Geoff Palmer (born 1954 in Cannock), former professional footballer, over 460 caps, mostly for Wolves
 Bobby Hosker (born 1955 in Cannock) former professional footballer, over 300 pro appearances
 Vernon Allatt (born 1959 in Cannock) an English former footballer, over 250 pro appearances
 Steve James (born 1961 in Cannock) former professional snooker player
 Dave Norton (born 1965 in Cannock), former professional footballer, over 430 pro appearances
 Mick Gosling (born 1972), winner of Britain's Strongest Man contest in 2005
 Richard Gosling (born 1974 ) winner of Britain's Strongest Man contest in 2003
 Kevin Pietersen (born 1980), South African-born English cricketer, played for Cannock Cricket Club in 2000
 Andy Bishop (born 1982 in Cannock), professional footballer, over 450 pro appearances
 Kris Taylor (born 1984 in Cannock), professional footballer, over 340 pro appearances
 Riley Parsons (born 2000 in Cannock), professional snooker player

Twin town
Cannock is twinned with:

 Datteln, Germany

See also
Listed buildings in Cannock

References

External links

BBC Domesday Reloaded – Domesday Reloaded – Overview of Cannock 

 
Towns in Staffordshire
Unparished areas in Staffordshire
Former civil parishes in Staffordshire
Cannock Chase District